John Wesley Claver Jones (November 12, 1949 – March 5, 1991), was an American television journalist.

He was a native of Philadelphia and the first African-American news anchor in the Philadelphia market. He first joined WCAU-TV fresh out of high school as a copy editor. While both continuing his education and working for channel 10 he first became a weekend booth announcer then rising in 1971 to reporter. It was said that John Facenda recognized his talent and mentored him. He eventually rose to the position of 11PM news anchor, but was let go in favor of Ralph Penza in 1976. He then moved to KYW-TV, then WLS-TV in Chicago. He returned to KYW-TV in 1983 and died at the age of 41 on March 5, 1991 of pancreatic cancer.

The Broadcast Pioneers of Philadelphia posthumously inducted Jones into their Hall of Fame in 2004.

References

External links
 Broadcast Pioneers of Philadelphia: Jack Jones

American television reporters and correspondents
Television anchors from Philadelphia
Television anchors from Chicago
African-American television personalities
1949 births
1991 deaths
American male journalists
Deaths from pancreatic cancer
20th-century African-American people